Gyulai may refer to:

 A type of Hungarian sausage

People
 Ignaz Gyulai (1763–1831), Austrian Empire general of the Napoleonic Wars
 Ferencz Gyulai (1798–1868), also known as Ferenc Gyulai, Ferencz Gyulaj, or Franz Gyulai, Hungarian nobleman who served as Austrian Governor of Lombardy-Venetia and commanded the losing Austrian army at the Battle of Magenta.
 István Gyulai (1943–2006), Hungarian television commentator and General Secretary of the IAAF
 Katalin Gyulai, Hungarian sprint canoeist
 Líviusz Gyulai (born 1937), Hungarian graphic artist, printmaker, and illustrator
 Márton Gyulai (born 1979), Hungarian bobsledder
Elemér Gyulai (1904–1945), Hungarian-Jewish composer

See also
 Gyulay (nobility)
 Gyula, a city in Hungary

Hungarian-language surnames